By the first decades of the 21st century, over a hundred biographies of Frédéric Chopin had been published.

Full biographies
Book-length biographies of Chopin's entire life include:
 

  (first name in German):
  (2 vols.)
 
  (2 vols.)
 
Volume I
Volume II

Partial biographies
Book-length biographies concentrating on a limited number of episodes in Chopin's life include:

Collections of primary documents
Bundled primary documents, such as letters and diaries, pertaining to Chopin's life include:
 Chopin's Letters (1931).
 Based on Henryk Opieński's collection
 Translations by Ethel Voynich
 Selected Correspondence of Fryderyk Chopin (1962).
 Based on Bronisław Edward Sydow's collection
 Translations by Arthur Hedley
 Chopin's Polish Letters (2016). .
 Published by the Fryderyk Chopin Institute.
 Translations by David Frick

References

Sources

External links
 Chopin Biography at Fryderyk Chopin Institute website.
 The Online Books Page: Chopin, Frédéric, 1810-1849 at University of Pennsylvania Libraries website.

Chopin, Frédéric, Biographies of
Frédéric Chopin